Taşkale is a town in the central district Karaman Province at Central Anatolia region of Turkey. It has (2000) population of 2224.

External links
Taşkale town,Karaman

Villages in Karaman Central District